Paul Harney (July 11, 1929 – August 24, 2011) was an American professional golfer and golf course owner who spent part of his career as a full-time PGA Tour player, but mostly was a club professional, part-time Tour player, and owner-operator of his own course.

Early life 
Harney was born and raised in Worcester, Massachusetts. He attended the College of the Holy Cross, which is located in his hometown; and was captain of the golf team.

Professional career 
Harney played full-time on the PGA Tour from 1955 to 1962; and part-time from 1963 to 1973. During that time, he won six PGA Tour events. His first win came at the 1957 Carling Open; he won his second PGA Tour event just two weeks later at the Labatt Open. In 1963 at the prime of his career, he fulfilled a promise made to his wife, Patricia, that when their oldest child started school, he would only play the tour on a part-time basis. He took his first club pro job at Sunset Oaks in northern California, where he stayed a couple years. He then moved his family across the country to Sutton, Massachusetts, where he took the club pro's job at Pleasant Valley Country Club.

Harney had a great deal of success in major championships, placing in the top-10 six times. His best finish in a major was 4th at the 1963 U.S. Open; however, he also finished in the top-8 four times at The Masters in the 1960s.

Harney has received many honors and awards. In 1957, he received Golf Digest's Most Improved Golfer award. He was inducted into the Holy Cross Varsity Club Hall of Fame in June 1963. In 1974, he earned "PGA Golf Professional of the Year" honors. In 1995, he became the first inductee into the New England Golf Hall of Fame. On September 8, 2005, Harney was enshrined into the PGA Golf Professional Hall of Fame.

Personal life 
As his competitive playing days were winding down, Harney used his prize money to open his own course in East Falmouth, Massachusetts, which he owned until his death. His daughter Erin is the general manager, and son Mike is the head pro. Harney had six children with his wife Patricia. He died in Falmouth, Massachusetts at the age of 82.

Professional wins (11)

PGA Tour wins (6)

PGA Tour playoff record (0–1)

Other wins (5)
1967 Massachusetts Open
1968 Massachusetts Open
1969 Massachusetts Open
1970 Massachusetts Open
1977 Massachusetts Open

Playoff record
Senior PGA Tour playoff record (0–1)

Results in major championships

Note: Harney never played in The Open Championship.

WD = withdrew
CUT = missed the half way cut
"T" indicates a tie for a place.

Summary

Most consecutive cuts made – 18 (1963 U.S. Open – 1973 Masters)
Longest streak of top-10s – 1 (six times)

See also
List of golfers with most PGA Tour wins

References

External links

American male golfers
PGA Tour golfers
PGA Tour Champions golfers
Golfers from Massachusetts
College of the Holy Cross alumni
Sportspeople from Worcester, Massachusetts
People from Falmouth, Massachusetts
1929 births
2011 deaths